William Loyall Gravatt (December 15, 1859 - February 14, 1942) became the second Bishop of West Virginia in the Episcopal Church in the United States, after serving as coadjutor to Bishop George William Peterkin.

Early and family life
Born in Port Royal, Virginia, William was the grandson of merchant Robert Gravatt, whose Huguenot ancestors had arrived in Caroline County, Virginia after France repealed the Edict of Nantes and began persecuting Protestants. His father was Dr. John James Gravatt (1817-1886) and mother Mary Eliza Smith of Richmond (daughter of Col. J.H. Smith of distinguished English ancestry). Dr. Gravatt served on the vestry of the local Episcopal church for 31 years, and was ultimately buried in the St. Peter's churchyard. One elder brother became a doctor like their father, a sister married a Confederate general, and John Gravatt also became an Episcopal priest in Virginia. During the American Civil War, Dr. Gravatt, a surgeon, ran a hospital in Richmond. After the war, Dr. Gravatt served as Port Royal's mayor as well as became a delegate to the Reconstruction Convention.

Young William Gravatt studied at Virginia Tech, and then theology at the Virginia Theological Seminary, graduating in 1884. He later received honorary degrees from Washington and Lee University and the University of the South.

He married Sidney S. Peyton of Richmond in 1887 and the couple would ultimately have four children, and die within hours of each other.

Career
After graduation, William Gravatt served as a curate at St. Paul's Church in Richmond, Virginia for three years, during which he was ordained as a deacon by bishop Francis McNeece Whittle in 1885 and as a priest by the same bishop the following year. Rev. Gravatt then became the rector at St. Peter's Church in Norfolk, Virginia, a newly founded parish where he served until 1893.

Rev. Gravatt then accepted the call from prestigious Zion Episcopal Church in Charles Town, West Virginia and became its rector. When West Virginia's Bishop George William Peterkin asked for appointment of a coadjutor in 1899, the diocesan council elected Rev. Gravatt. He was consecrated in November 10, 1899 by Bishops Peterkin, Whittle and Missionary Bishop Charles Clifton Penick.

Rt.Rev. Gravatt ultimately succeeded Rt.Rev. Peterkin in 1916, and retired in 1939, the year he helped consecrate his nephew John J. Gravatt (brother John's son).

Death and legacy
The retired bishop and his wife of 54 years, Sidney Peyton Gravatt, died within 2 hours of each other at their home in Charleston in 1942. Joint services were held at Zion Episcopal Church, Charles Town, where they were both laid to rest.

The Episcopal Diocese of West Virginia continues to honor its second bishop, as a building at the diocesan Peterkin Conference Center in Romney, West Virginia is named in his honor.

See also

 List of Succession of Bishops for the Episcopal Church, USA

References

1859 births
1942 deaths
Episcopal Diocese of West Virginia
Virginia Theological Seminary alumni
Bishops in West Virginia
People from Port Royal, Virginia
Episcopalians from Virginia
Episcopalians from West Virginia
Episcopal bishops of West Virginia
Burials at Zion Episcopal Churchyard (Charles Town, West Virginia)